Milford Colony is a Hutterite community and census-designated place (CDP) in Lewis and Clark County, Montana, United States.

The community is in the valley of Flat Creek, an east-flowing tributary of the Dearborn River, which runs southeast to the Missouri River.

Milford Colony was first listed as a CDP prior to the 2020 census.

Demographics

References 

Census-designated places in Lewis and Clark County, Montana
Census-designated places in Montana
Hutterite communities in the United States